Stenoma uruguayensis is a moth in the family Depressariidae. It was described by Carlos Berg in 1885. It is found in Uruguay.

References

Moths described in 1885
Stenoma